Togni is an Italian surname, may refer to:

Camillo Togni, Italian composer
Darix Togni (1922–1976), Italian circus man
Eugênio Rômulo Togni (born 1982), retired Brazilian footballer and current football coach
Franco Togni (1960-2016), Italian male marathon runner and mountain runner
Gastón Alberto Togni (born 1997), Argentine professional football forward
Gianni Togni, Italian singer
Marco Togni, Italian Mathematician
Peter Togni, Canadian composer
Raul Togni Neto (born 1992), Brazilian professional basketball player 
Rômulo Eugênio Togni, (born 1982) Brazilian footballer
Victor Togni, Swiss Canadian organist

See also 
 Mamma Togni, an Italian dramatic monologue by Dario Fo and Franca Rame

Italian-language surnames